The Floyd Baronetcy is a title in the Baronetage of the United Kingdom. It was created on 30 March 1816 for General John Floyd. He was second-in-command at the Battle of Seringapatam in 1799. Floyd's daughter Julia was the wife of Prime Minister Sir Robert Peel, 2nd Baronet. The fifth Baronet was a Brigadier in the 15th/19th Hussars and was Chief-of-Staff of the Eighth Army from 1944 to 1945. Between 1961 and 1968 he served as Lord-Lieutenant of Buckinghamshire. The seventh Baronet was High Sheriff of Rutland in 1968. The fourth baronet's youngest son, Charles Murray Floyd, was a prominent businessman, surveyor and land agent.

Floyd baronets (1816)
Sir John Floyd, 1st Baronet (1748–1818)
Sir Henry Floyd, 2nd Baronet (1793–1868)
Sir John Floyd, 3rd Baronet (1823–1909)
Sir Henry Robert Peel Floyd, 4th Baronet (1855–1915)
Brigadier Sir Henry Robert Kincaid Floyd, 5th Baronet (1899–1968)
Sir John Duckett Floyd, 6th Baronet (1903–1975)
Sir Giles Henry Charles Floyd, 7th Baronet (born 1932), married Lady Gillian Cecil, daughter of David Cecil, 6th Marquess of Exeter.

The heir apparent to the baronetcy is David Henry Cecil Floyd (born 1956), eldest son of the 7th Baronet.
The heir apparent's heir presumptive is Henry William Floyd (born 1994), his nephew and grandson of the 7th Baronet.

Arms

Notes

References
Kidd, Charles, Williamson, David (editors). Debrett's Peerage and Baronetage (1990 edition). New York: St Martin's Press, 1990, 

Floyd